Nuria Llagostera Vives and Arantxa Parra Santonja were the defending champions but they decided not to participate together.
Llagostera Vives partnered Dominika Cibulková and Parra Santonja partnered up with Alicja Rosolska. Both of them were beaten in the first round.
Bethanie Mattek-Sands and Sania Mirza won the title against Anna-Lena Grönefeld and Květa Peschke after defeating them 4–6, 6–4, [10–7] in the final.

Seeds

Draw

Draw

References
 Main Draw

Brisbane International - Doubles
Women's Doubles